The Vertebral Artery Test or Wallenberg Test is a physical exam for vertebral artery insufficiency.

Commonly, the VA test involves cervical spine motion to an end-range position of rotation, extension or a combination of both.  At this point, the physician assesses for vertebrobasilar insufficiency (VBI) symptoms.  If the patient has VBI symptoms during the test, it is considered a positive result and a contraindication for cervical manipulation.

The specifics of VA testing vary among authors.

The test is positive if the patient complains of dizziness, visual changes, or nystagmus occurs.

References

Osteopathic manipulative medicine
Osteopathic techniques